Mohamad Jawad Khalifeh   

Professor of surgery Mohamad Jawad Khalifeh (MD, Fellow of the American College of Surgeons (FACS), Fellow of the Royal College of physicians (FRCPEng), Fellow of the Royal College of Surgeons (FRCSEng)) was born on November 7, 1961, Sarafand, Lebanon. After obtaining his medical qualifications (MD) from the University of Bucharest-Romania in 1985, Professor Khalifeh has trained in surgery and obtained his specialty degree in general surgery from the American University of Beirut-Lebanon in 1991. He completed his fellowships in surgery between 1990-1998 in London hospitals with special interest in Vascular, Cancer and Liver Transplantation surgery (at Watford, St. Thomas, King’s College, Royal Free Hospital. University of London). Back to Lebanon in 1991, he chaired the division of General Surgery and was appointed as the Director of the Liver Transplant and Hepato-Pancreatico-Biliary Unit at the American University of Beirut Medical Center where he performed the first liver transplantation surgery in the region and pioneered many other major surgical techniques. 
In the period between 2004-2010, Professor Khalifeh was named in five successive governments as the minister of Public Health of Lebanon. In addition to his public duties, Professor Khalifeh kept practicing surgeries at AUB-Medical Center, teaching students, training residents and producing research.  Under his terms as Minister of Health, Lebanon launched its first ever structured public health services inaugurating a network of accredited primary health care centers in addition to opening over 20 public hospitals in the country several of which are affiliated with universities and other educational institutions. Professor Khalife has also played a role in setting up a new registry for quality and pricing of pharmaceuticals in Lebanon under a major reform plan. Another considerable achievement has been the adoption by the Lebanese government of a health reform plan that guarantees a mandatory public national health insurance system to every citizen and for the first time, Professor Khalifeh launched an official National Cancer Registry (NCR) in Lebanon. 

Professor Khalifeh was awarded in two occasions by two presidents of the country (General Emile Lahoud and General Michel Sleiman) with the Order of Cedar’s Award as an Officer and Commander in 2004 and 2009 respectively. Moreover, he was acknowledged by honorary fellowships of the Royal College of Physicians and the Royal College of Surgeons in England. He is chairing and is a member of many national and international academic societies.

On June 7, 2021, Dr. Khalife was awarded the highest and most prestigious decoration of Sierra Leone by his excellency, President Bigadier (Rtd) Dr. Julius Maada Bio, the Order of the Rockel in the capital of Sierra Leone, Freetown. Dr. Khalife received this decoration for “his outstanding leadership and unwavering commitment to transforming the health sector in [his] country and for sterling contribution to promoting excellence in medical research, training, and cooperation", as read by Dr. Patrick K. Muana, senior advisor to President Bio on Strategic Communication. This effectively made Dr. Mohammad Khalife Grand Commander of the order of the Republic of Sierra Leone.

References

Year of birth missing (living people)
Living people
Government ministers of Lebanon
Hezbollah politicians

Lebanese Shia Muslims